Dialect discrimination refers to the unequal treatment of those whose dialect contains linguistic features identifying them with a certain geographical or social group. One may experience dialect discrimination in a number of settings, but this type of discrimination may be most prominent in the workplace. While there is not enough data to know how often it occurs, it is possible that a number of people may experience dialect discrimination during the job application process, as employers strive for their staff to utilize a more “standardized” or “neutral” form of speaking. Dialect discrimination may also be present in education and politics. Children in school whose dialect does not closely resemble the standard form of speaking may not receive the same education. Likewise, those who speak in a manner that is not associated with the common dialect of an area or country may be slandered or even unable to vote in politics. It is disputed whether or not this form of discrimination is prohibited by the EEOC.

Discrimination 
Discrimination can be defined as the unfair treatment of a person or a group based on something for which they identify. Discrimination is often seen as categorical. Some categorical examples of this include, but are not limited to; race, gender, age or sexual orientation. Although it is not clear why humans practice discrimination, many researchers believe that it may stem from fear and misunderstanding of something, like a dialect, that others may not resonate with. This article will mainly focus on the discrimination that is dialect and language-based.

How specific language discrimination is linked 
Language discrimination is when someone is treated/looked at differently than others because of their native language. This kind of discrimination is viewed on a national level and is illegal.“Title VII of the Civil Rights Act of 1964 prohibits an employer from discriminating against any individual with respect to his or her compensation, terms, condition, or privileges of employment because of that individual’s national origin…” (Marina 347). Other types of discrimination like dialect or accent discrimination are considered to be on a more federal level and not considered national.

Language discrimination is not technically seen as part of the EEOC, other than the category of national origin. Considering this, punishment for discrimination that is seen within the category that would be considered “Language” can be minimal but could stretch as large as jail time.

Examples 
Workplace: A really good example of dialect discrimination would be workplace dialect discrimination. A lot of times individuals will not be hired for a job because of the way he or she speaks or sounds. And another thing that is difficult and at the Forefront of media, today is the fact that if your primary language is not English and you are trying to get hired by an English-speaking company many companies will not hire you because of this. Although this is seen as illegal in many states it is still a very wide reason why some people do not get jobs. The employer may not tell the employee that that is the reason he or she is not being hired but usually, it is the underlying cause.

Schools: Dialect Discrimination can be found is in schools. Something that a lot of families struggle with is they will put their child in a school that is primarily English-speaking and the child will get discriminated against and not get the same tools that other students are getting as far as learning goes because of the way they speak or sound. A lot of times Hispanic languages get looked down on in primary education schools. Because of this a lot of Hispanic immersion schools have been created however language and dialect discrimination is the root cause.

Political: There is dialect discrimination in politics. A lot of times candidates running for a government position are discriminated against because of the way they sound. A lot of time Society will label a political figure as undereducated based on the way that they sound. Obviously, this is a problem and is categorized as discrimination ended up itself. Also, citizens have been banned and can be denied the right to vote based on whether or not they passed a literacy test.

References 

Prejudice and discrimination by type